Knowing Bros, also known as Men on a Mission or Ask Us Anything, is a South Korean television entertainment program produced by SM C&C that premiered on December 5, 2015, and currently airs on Saturdays at JTBC. Although the show has taken on different formats in some episodes, the program features a high school classroom setting with the fixed cast - the titular "brothers" - acting as same-aged students. Guests arrive posing as visiting students from another school and are interviewed by the cast in a talk show segment; the program's second half usually features a variety segment, with the cast and guests taking of activities such as games, talent show, or improvisational acting.

Knowing Bros' current fixed cast includes Kang Ho-dong, Lee Soo-geun, Kim Young-chul, Seo Jang-hoon, Kim Heechul, Min Kyunghoon, Lee Sangmin, and Lee Jin-ho; Hwang Chi-yeul and Kim Se-hwang were initial cast members in the program's first few episodes. Jang Sung-kyu and Shindong have appeared as recurring special guests by hosting the show's game segments. The show received several accolades during its run.

Format

The current format (from episode 17) explores the high school concept where the cast members act like students in a classroom while guests come as newly transferred students. Most of the segments for this format portray activities that every student would do with their classmates. Subsequently, the program sometimes diversifies at the end with a segment outside of the school concept. This format has received praise from the viewers and led to a significant increase in ratings and popularity of the program.

A notable aspect of the show is the usage of the banmal (Hangul: 반말; "informal language") manner of speech used by everyone regardless of their age or seniority, thus disregarding the Korean language's strict seniority rules with spoken language and the sunbae–hoobae hierarchy in the Korean entertainment industry. The informal speech and casual setting also encourages the guests and cast to interact with each other as schoolmates often do, leading them to be comfortable enough to tease one another.

There are at least two permanent segments, which have defined the Brother School format:
 Entrance Application – a segment where a cast member (typically Lee Soo-Geun) reads the application forms the guests filled beforehand and other cast members comment on them. A highlight of this segment is the guests' preference for which cast members they would like or would not like to sit next to. The guests typically show their strengths and/or weaknesses through this segment.
 Guess About Me – a segment where the guests have prepared several questions related to themselves. Some of the questions are vague or extremely private and concern something the guests have never revealed to the public. In another format, idol groups with more than 5 members that are visiting for the first time will have their names covered, and as Heechul reveals a fact about the member, the group members would try to confuse the cast.

Segments 
The episodes may also feature any of the following segments, usually within, in between, or following the above permanent segments:
 Second Period – a segment that usually comes after the permanent segments and varies between guests. In most cases, the guests have made suggestions on the activities for this segment. Examples include counseling sessions, art class, and physical education class.
 Let's Play – a short segment where the guests challenge the cast members to a game which the former is confident in winning, usually by unorthodox means such as on-the-spot rules. The segment usually ends with a challenge where the guest needs to defeat every cast member consecutively.
 Three No's (No Concept, No Basis, No Script) – a segment that revolves around an ad-libbed skit where the cast members and guests are not given any dialogue or definite storyline. They can only rely on the overall theme of the particular week's skit and their own comedic timing.
 Music Class (Songstagram) – a segment where the guests have created a list of songs with a specific theme of their preference. The segment focuses on the cast members' effort in guessing all of them in the correct order. There are often hints such as release date, characteristics, or "Jonghyun's game" as it was introduced in ep. 29 by the late Jonghyun (Shinee), wherein the beginning syllable/note of a verse is given with its rhythm to help the members guess the song name.
 Lee Sang-min Time – formally introduced in ep. 56 and formerly called Choose Your Type, is a short segment wherein the guests (usually the females) are briefed by Lee Sang-min to choose any of the cast members (plus any accompanying male guest) as their ideal partner. The specifications are that all members are "equal" in terms of legal, socioeconomic, & civil statuses; and that the choice is based only on their physical appearances and personalities.
 Dancestagram – formally introduced in ep. 57 by Chanmi (AOA). In Psy's episode it became a segment where the PD plays the beginning syllable/note of a song and they have to guess the title, lyrics, and dance move.
  99 Seconds Teamwork Competition – a segment that is often used when a large group of people are guests on the program, such as idol groups. The segment varies each episode in terms of missions, but the members and guests must complete them within 99 seconds. If a team manages to complete them in time, the other team is given a chance to produce a better time record.
  Classical Culture Class  - a segment all about pop culture references to forgotten decades.
  Imagination Time  - a segment which starts with a warm-up, like drawing something from shapes, and guessing lip-synced words. The highlight of "Imagination Time" (Hangul: 상상력 시간) is Guess the Drama Line. The members and guests have to guess what the next line of the scene from a drama shown to them is.
  Knowing Lunch  - a segment that comes in between the Entrance Application segment and the Guess About Me segment. The members and guests answer questions (either in an individual battle or as a team) given by the production team and if they are guessed correctly they can eat one of the numerous side dishes selected, other than white rice and light soy sauce that was already provided beforehand.  
 A variation of this is that each member must ask a question of their choice, but only the specified number of people can guess correctly. For example: Only 4 people can answer this question correctly: What is the name of the famous picture painted by Norwegian painter Edvard Munch? In ep. 183, since Jeon So-mi answered with a transliteration of its English name (The Scream), and only 3 others answered by its Korean name, it was still deemed as a pass after review.
 There is also one question where a specially requested item is covered under a cloche. The way to gain the food item varies in each episode.
 XXX Scholarship Quiz - a second half segment in Brother School, where Shindong (Super Junior) enters the classroom and hosts the quiz. The members and guests form pairs and play the games to enjoy the food. Typically this consists of two segments:
 Consonants Charades: When two consonants are given, whichever pair hits the buzzer first gets to answer. To answer, one of the pair has to express the word without saying what the word is, and the other has to guess the word.
 Mix Music Quiz: Shindong sings the lyrics to song "B" in the melody of song "A". One of the pair has to answer song "A" and its singer, and the other of the pair has to answer song "B" and its singer.
 Job Consultation Room - an official corner of the show after the Brother School segment for the episode has ended. Jang Sung-kyu, Shindong and Jeong Se-woon would let guests (different from in Brother School), as Variety Job Lookers, to prove their variety skills to the three.
 After School Activities - the cast members each learn something unique that is not done during the "lesson" in Brother School. This segment is shown on both TV and YouTube, after the end of a Knowing Bros episode.
 Dong Dong Shin Ki: Kang Ho-dong, together with Shindong (Super Junior), visits various idols and learn idol songs choreographs. Several other guests will then watch the final dancing videos and comment on them. This activity lasted from July 11 to October 24, 2020.
 Universe Hipsters: Universe Cowards (Kim Hee-chul, Min Kyung-hoon) visit rappers and learn hip hop and rapping from them. This activity began from October 31, 2020, to January 2, 2021.
 Lots of Advice: Seo Jang-hoon and Lee Soo-geun, a duo in Brother School that is well known for their chemistry, get advices on various games, alongside Shindong (Super Junior). This activity began from January 16 to April 17, 2021.

Special
 Special segment: Knowing Bros Award, An annual year-closing episode, Knowing Bros Awards, started on December 29, 2018. In the episode, the hosts review the corners and the appearances from the guests that were featured in the latest year. Hosts and some special guests are also provided with distinctive awards.

 Special episodes: These episodes do not follow the Brother School format.

Previous

Presenters

Cast
The program's original cast consisted of Kang Ho-dong, Lee Soo-geun, Seo Jang-hoon, Kim Young-chul, Kim Hee-chul, Hwang Chi-yeul and Kim Se-hwang. Min Kyung-hoon was added to the cast formation on the second episode aired on December 12, 2015. Hwang Chi-yeul and Kim Se-hwang left the program after the seventh episode, which aired on January 16, 2016. Lee Sang-min joined the cast on March 5, 2016.

Current cast
{| class="wikitable" style="font-size:95%"
|-
! style="width:10%; text-align:center;" | Name
! style="width:22%; text-align:center;" | Nickname(s)
! style="width:15%; text-align:center;" | Duration
! style="width:55%; text-align:center;" | Notes
|-
| style="text-align:center;" 강호동
| style="text-align:left;" | Brother School Captain (아형고 통)
| Ep. 1present
| style="text-align:left;" | The oldest and strongest member of the cast, who is known for his outdated comedic sense. He is a highly decorated former Ssireum athlete, who managed to receive many awards throughout his professional career. The cast members often tease him for his friendly rivalry as the Nation's MC with Yoo Jae-suk, and the fact that he has the highest appearance fee out of the members due to his seniority in the industry. He is often called out for his poor treatment of guests when he was the MC of Star King. He is also the 'center' of the class because he often sits misaligned to the table, giving the illusion of him being the center from the point of view of the guests and teachers standing at the front. He is also teased for not fixing his Southeastern dialect although Heechul had to fix his Gangwon-do dialect. After he defeated Seo Jang-hoon in the battle of looks in episodes 107–108, he acquired the nickname “Face Genius” (얼굴천재) from Oh My Girl member, Seunghee

His main theme song is "The Godfather Waltz" by Nino Rota from the film The Godfather; and occasionally a variation of "The Imperial March (Darth Vader's Theme)", usually by Japanese group Kuricorder Quartet.
|-
| style="text-align:center;" 이수근
| style="text-align:left;" | Dwarf Village Chief (소인마을 이장)
| Ep. 1present
| style="text-align:left;" | He is known as the right-hand man of Kang Ho-dong and the class clown of the program. He is responsible for reading the Entrance Application of new students. The cast members often tease his previous gambling scandal that caused him to resign from all TV activities for a couple of years. He has also been teased for being cold and distant towards people who had been in other shows with him, a stark contrast to Hodong. he is considered the funniest member due to his blunt and straightfoward jokes, and is known for his farting in class.

His main theme song is "All In Theme (Orchestra Version)" from the 2003 South Korean drama All In; and occasionally "Public Enemy" (공공의 적) by Jo Yeong-wook from the 2002 South Korean film of the same name, "You Be Illin'" by hip hop group Run-DMC, and "La La Song" by Hoyt Curtin from the animated television series The Smurfs.
|-
| style="text-align:center;" 김영철
| style="text-align:left;" | The one whose seat is always taken away (맨날 자리 뺏기는 애)
| Ep. 1present
| style="text-align:left;" | On this show, Kim is in charge of being the awkward and unfunny person in everybody's high school class (despite him being very entertaining in real life). He is also known for his promise to leave the program once it passed the 5% viewership rating (Ep. 68, when he was absent when Hyeri came with Girl's Day). This became a return joke in 2021 because Hyeri never returned to the show for 4 years when she appeared with Rosé of BlackPink in Ep 272. He is the most fluent English speaker, touted as the most fluent English-speaking Korean comedian. His English jokes are considered unfunny however, only because nobody else can fully understand him. Also, he is known as the ugly one, and most of the guests usually pick him as a seat mate they never want to have (Except for twice's Tzuyu, who sat next to him too much)

"Gone Not Around Any Longer" (있다 없으니까) by South Korean duo SISTAR19 is occasionally his theme song, in addition to his own songs "Ring Ring" (따르릉) & "Andenayon" (안되나용); his North Korean theme songs include "Greetings" (반갑습니다) by North Korean singer Ri Kyong-suk (리경숙), & "Whistle" (휘파람) by North Korean singer Jon Hye-yong (전혜영).
|-
| style="text-align:center;" 서장훈
| style="text-align:left;" | 207 centimeter Giant (207CM 거인)
| Ep. 1present
| style="text-align:left;" | A former center of the Korean Basketball League, he is the tallest member of the cast. Often teased about his height (207 cm, roughly 6 feet 9 inches), wealth (to the point of him being a landlord), high-profile divorce and bad physical health. He was later teased about his germaphobia, in a much more serious case than Heechul, hence nobody else has actually seen any of his properties. He is also known for having close guesses in "Guess About Me", only to be robbed at the last minute. However, when he does get it right, he sometimes walks from the corner to the high-boom camera in the other corner of the room, often performing some sort of celebratory action. he's often teased about his high class lifestyle and the fact he owns many buildings. When he cosplays as a female character, her name is Rose (Ep.4).

His main theme song is "The Last Match" (마지막 승부) by South Korean singer Kim Min-gyo, the theme song of the 1994 South Korean drama of the same name; and occasionally "Scars" (상처만) by South Korean singer BOIS from the 2010 South Korean drama Secret Garden, and "Rainism" by South Korean singer Rain.
|-
| style="text-align:center;" 김희철
| style="text-align:left;" | Psycho (돌I, 돌+아이; the actual spelling being an insult as well as a swear word)
| Ep. 1 present
| style="text-align:left;" | The craziest member of the cast, who is known for his blunt and straightforward comments, which he tries to damp down when long-time acquaintances are guests of the program. He is teased for entering the classroom while rubbing his hands and having "magnets" in his leg due to a car accident in 2006. In episode 272 in 2021, his left hip weakness still hasn't improved on a blind marching test. He is also known as the anti-smoking ambassador, who used to smoke during his youth but quit to let others know the harmful effects of smoking, and was the first of the group to do so (He and Kang Ho Dong have quit smoking and Kim Young-Chul is a non-smoker). He becomes a transfer student (guest) when he is promoting with Super Junior.
While he is well versed in Korean TV and entertainment history, he, unlike Hodong and Janghoon, has no interest or knowledge in sports.

His main theme songs are "Sorry, Sorry" and "Mr. Simple", both by his group Super Junior.
|-
| style="text-align:center;" 민경훈
| style="text-align:left;" | Ssamja (쌈자)
| Ep. 2present
| style="text-align:left;" | The youngest member of the cast. He is sometimes referred to as Janghoon's son and is known for his mature comments and risqué thoughts. His rebellious attitude toward Kang Ho-dong, the oldest member of the show, has garnered much public interest. He is the vocalist of rock band Buzz and is often teased for his head voice and exaggerated use of vibrato. Known to be both the worst dancer among the brothers for his lack of bodily rhythm and the least knowledgeable when it comes to names in the entertainment business. It is an ongoing joke that a celebrity is only really famous if Kyung-hoon knows who he/she is. Many celebrities, specifically idols, therefore ask him if he knows who they are. He is also the most agile of the members because he has trained in martial arts since elementary school. Another running gag in the show is when Kyung-hoon sees an actress or idol he loves, his facial hairs begin to show, or his ears turn red, as well as a dimple. Another running gag is his use of poop jokes, which he uses when he runs out of answers to a question. 
His main theme songs are from his group Buzz, usually "Thorn" (가시), "Coward" (겁쟁이), & "Reds Go Together"; and occasionally "Careless Whisper" by George Michael, and "Sweet Dream" (나비잠) by both Kyung-hoon and Hee-chul.
|-
| style="text-align:center;" 이상민
| style="text-align:left;" | The sad one (안쓰러운 애)
| Ep. 15present (regular)Ep. 14 (guest)
| style="text-align:left;" | He is often teased for his divorced status and infamously huge financial debt. Due to this, he frequently gives honest advice towards young idol singers. He was a successful songwriter and record producer, specializing mostly in hip-hop and dance music, and he did have a muscular body because he managed to lose 22 kg. His nickname was given by Lee Soo-geun, which is an abbreviation of "his current situation is miserable", a reference to him being in debt. In 2018, after he finally paid off his most of his debts, he was able to apply for a low-limit credit card for the first time in 13 years, and bought Iced Americano for the other members, as his credit rating went from Grade 10 (the worst) to Grade 6. He usually asks rich idols for money to pay off his debt. In 2021, he became a hip health ambassador, after discovering that Heechul's left hip is still weak after the car accident in 2006, and Min kyung-hoon's right hip is poor due to his tendency to use his left leg as a plant leg when performing martial arts kicks. Since Lee Sang-min and Seo Jang-hoon are both divorced and live alone, they also aren't used to sharing things with others.

His main theme song is the ending song of the South Korean documentary program Screening Humanity; and occasionally "1997 Spring" from the 2001 Japanese film Calmi Cuori Appassionati, as well as "The Last Waltz" from the 2003 South Korean film Oldboy.
|-
| style="text-align:center;" 이진호
| style="text-align:left;" | WikiJinho (Wiki진호) 
'Is that the best?(최선이 다 입니까?)
| Ep. 304present
| style="text-align:left;" | The newest addition to the permanent cast, he is widely known as WikiJinho due to his knowledge in every topic the guest mentioned. A rising ace in the variety industry, his jokes made every cast laugh before and after becoming a cast member. He is also, however, the victim of media play, with many articles asking if "Is that the best Knowing Bros can do?". Hence giving his other nickname (최선이 다 입니까?)
He also became the newest victim of the Front Row Curse, as he now sits on the seat that used to be occupied by Kim Young-chul, meaning he has very few shots on camera.

He was the strongest member of Ssireum as he defeated Kang Ho-dong, the former National Champion, but lost to Moon Bin of ASTRO.

He is also teased for being a poor dancer. 
|}

Former cast

Special Cast

 Timeline 

List of episodes

 Series overview

Ratings
 Note that the show airs on a cable channel (pay TV), which plays part in its slower uptake and relatively small audience share when compared to programs broadcast (FTA) on public networks such as KBS, SBS, MBC or EBS.
 NR rating means "not reported". The rating is low.
 TNmS have stopped publishing their rating report from June 2018.
 In the ratings below, the highest rating for the show will be in red, and the lowest rating for the show will be in blue each year.

Other works

Discography

Other appearances

Other Show appearances

YouTube
They started their YouTube channel called "아는형님 Knowingbros" on October 10, 2020.

Controversy
Disciplinary action
In December 2016, the program received a disciplinary action from South Korea's Broadcast Censorship Committee for using improper remarks, which included objectifying female guests on multiple occasions. In one episode, Min Kyung-hoon gives a handcrafted bra to a female guest (Jeon So-min). The committee also highlighted the use of improper language between cast members and the use of homophobic remarks. Besides a warning given by the committee, it is reported that the program has also received numerous complaints from viewers regarding the matter.

Awards and nominations

 Notes 

References

External links
 
 Men on a Mission'' on JTBC Worldwide
 

 
2020s South Korean television series
2015 South Korean television series debuts
Korean-language television shows
JTBC original programming
South Korean variety television shows
Television series by SM C&C